How Long is the second solo studio album by American West Coast hip hop recording artist L.V. It was released on August 29, 2000 through Loud Records.

Track listing 

Sample credits
"Everyday Hustler" contains elements from "Ready or Not Here I Come (Can't Hide from Love)" by The Delfonics (1968)
"Woman's Gotta Have It" contains elements from "Woman's Gotta Have It" by Bobby Womack (1972)

Personnel 
Vocalists

 Larry Sanders – vocals, background vocals
 Shari Watson – vocals (track 2)
 Corey Woods – vocals (track 6)
 Terrell Carter – background vocals (tracks: 3, 13)
 Ira Gilroy – background vocals (track 4)
 Reginald Scriven – background vocals (track 4)
 Troy Taylor – background vocals (track 8)
 Reginald Scriven – background vocals (track 10)
 Scooter Mac – background vocals (track 10)
 Brian Laskey – background vocals (track 11)
 Bradford Mc Worther – background vocals (track 12)
 Bruce Mahew – background vocals (track 12)
 Carroll "CB" Brady – background vocals (track 12)
 Gregory Kirkland – background vocals (track 12)
 Roman Tarplin – background vocals (track 12)

Instrumentalists

 Patrick Kemp – additional keyboards (tracks: 1, 11, 16)
 Billy Moss – keyboards (track 9)
 Paul Marchavich – keyboards (track 9)
 Anthony Chandler – guitar (track 4)
 Carl Kizine – guitar (track 9)
 Cynthia Ross – bass (track 9)

Technicals

 Larry Sanders – executive producer, producer (track 10)
 Henry "Black" Butler – executive producer, mixing (track 12)
 Steve Russell – producer (tracks: 1, 11, 16)
 Mario Winans – producer (tracks: 2, 6)
 Marc Kinchen – producer (tracks: 3, 13)
 Billy Moss – producer (tracks: 5, 9)
 Myron – producer (tracks: 14-15)
 James Broadway – producer & recording (track 4)
 Darryl Young – producer & recording (track 7)
 Marc Gordon – producer & recording (track 12)
 The Characters – producers (track 8)
 Alex "Cat" Cantrall – producer (track 15)
 Mike Mason – co-producer (tracks: 3, 13)
 Mo Stewart – co-producer & recording (track 10)
 Anthony Chandler – co-producer (track 4)
 Kenny Smooth – co-producer (track 7)
 Lou Michaels – recording (tracks: 1, 11, 16)
 Slam – recording (tracks: 2, 5-6, 9)
 Blaze – recording (tracks: 3, 13)
 Antonio Cristi – recording (track 4)
 Kenny Ochoa – recording (track 7)
 Kevin Thomas – recording (track 8)
 Doe – recording (tracks: 14-15)
 Dusty Porch – recording (track 16)
 Robert Brown – mixing (tracks: 2, 6)
 Nick Marshall – mixing (tracks: 3, 13)
 Rob Chiarelli – mixing (tracks: 3-4, 7-8, 13)
 Jeff Gregory – mixing (tracks: 4, 7-8)
 Dave Pensado – mixing (tracks: 5, 9, 12, 14-15)
 Jeff Griffin – mixing (tracks: 5, 9, 14-15)
 Mike Olson – mixing (track 6)
 Eddy Schreyer – mastering

Additional
 David Bett – artwork
 Mark Hanauer – photography

Charts

References

External links

2000 albums
L.V. (singer) albums
Loud Records albums